Thimiru is a 2006 Indian Tamil-language action film written and directed by debutant Tarun Gopi. It stars Vishal, Reema Sen and Sriya Reddy in lead and former football player I. M. Vijayan, Manoj K. Jayan and Vadivelu in supporting roles, whilst Kiran Rathod appears in an item number. The film's score and soundtrack are composed by Yuvan Shankar Raja. Produced by Vikram Krishna, under the banner of G K Film Corporation, it was released on 4 August 2006.  Thimiru became highly successful at the box office and one of the top-grossing Tamil films in 2006.

The film was also praised for Vishal and Sriya Reddy's performance and Vadivelu's comedy. The film also has been dubbed in Telugu as Pogaru. It was later remade by director Vishal Raj in Kannada as Minchu but failed to repeat the success of its original version. It was also remade in Bhojpuri as Ae Balma Biharwala.

Plot
 
Ganesh comes from Madurai to continue his medical course in Chennai. Srimathy, Ganesh's professor's daughter, wants to meet Ganesh and thank him for helping her escape from the clutches of some goons. When Ganesh and Srimathy meet, they are surprised as they know each other. Having spotted both of them, some unknown gangsters vow to kill them, which leads to Ganesh and Srimathy's past.

Eswari is an arrogant moneylender, who lends money at usurious rates and goes after families who fail to repay. Srimathy's family falls afoul of Eswari, where Ganesh helps Srimathy's folks. Eswari falls for Ganesh's bravery and proposes to him, but he rejects her. She ends up kidnapping Ganesh's parents and threatening Ganesh to accept her.

However, Ganesh thwarts all her plans, but in a freak mishap, Eswari's brothers mistakes Ganesh to be the reason for their sister's death, where her brothers Periya Karuppu and Chinna Karuppu  resolve to kill him. Ganesh, who reaches Chennai for safety, is eventually forced to go back to his old ways and fights the goons to restore order.

Cast

 Vishal as Ganesh
 Reema Sen as Srimathy (Voice dubbed by Renuka Kathir) 
 Sriya Reddy as Easwari (Voice dubbed by Jayageetha)
 Vadivelu as Warden Vallaran
 Manoj K. Jayan as Periya Karuppu
 I. M. Vijayan as Chinna Karuppu
 Vinayakan as Easwari's sidekick
 Sriranjini as Srimathy's mother
 Neelima Rani as Srimathy's friend
 Nizhalgal Ravi as Principal
 Pawan as Bhavani
 Manikka Vinayagam as Ganesh's father
 Bhanu Chander as Ganesh's uncle
 Hemalatha
 Robo Chandru
 Singamuthu in a cameo
 Mayilsamy in a cameo
 Aarthi in a cameo
 Kiran Rathod in a special appearance in the song 'Maana Madura'
 Kanal Kannan in a special appearance in the song 'Oppurane Oppurane'

Soundtrack

The soundtrack, composed by Yuvan Shankar Raja, was released on 21 July 2006 and features 6 tracks overall, including a "Theme music". The lyrics were written by Pa. Vijay, Na. Muthukumar and Yugabharathi. Rajesh Ramnath lifted the five songs for the Kannada version of the film, Minchu, not giving due credits to the original composer Yuvan Shankar Raja.

References

External links
 
 Listen to Thimiru songs at Raaga

2006 films
Indian action films
2000s masala films
2006 action films
Films shot in Madurai
Tamil films remade in other languages
2000s Tamil-language films
2006 directorial debut films